Kolchyno is an urban-type settlement in Mukacheve Raion (district) of Zakarpattia Oblast (province) in western Ukraine. The town's population was 4,407 as of the 2001 Ukrainian Census. Current population: .

See also
 Chynadiyovo, the other urban-type settlement in Mukachevo Raion of Zakarpattia Oblast

References

Urban-type settlements in Mukachevo Raion
Populated places established in the 1430s